Outlet Collection Winnipeg is a fully-enclosed shopping centre development located on the intersection of Sterling Lyon Parkway and Kenaston Boulevard, in Winnipeg, Manitoba, Canada. It was developed by Ivanhoé Cambridge, a major Canadian real-estate company.

History
After the opening of the first IKEA in Winnipeg on the intersection of Kenaston Boulevard and Sterling Lyon Parkway at Seasons of Tuxedo in December 2012, retail quickly began to expand starting with a Cabela's, later joined by restaurants, other small retailers, and residential properties. 

Ivanhoe Cambridge decided to expand the retail development in the new expanding retail along Kenaston Boulevard just across from IKEA, breaking ground in September 2015 costing $200 Million to build.

Opening

On May 3, 2017, the mall officially opened its doors to large crowds, showcasing 28 new stores to Winnipeg, being the first dedicated outlet mall in Manitoba.

See also 
 Vaughan Mills
 Tsawwassen Mills
 CrossIron Mills

References

External links 

 Outlet Collection Winnipeg

Buildings and structures in Winnipeg
Shopping malls in Manitoba
Shopping malls established in 2017
Power centres (retail) in Canada
Outlet malls in Canada
Ivanhoé Cambridge
Tuxedo, Winnipeg